Jerónimo de Corella O.S.H.  (born in Spain) was a Spanish clergyman and bishop for the Roman Catholic Archdiocese of Tegucigalpa. He was ordained in 1556. He was appointed bishop in 1563. He died in 1575.

References 

1575 deaths
Spanish Roman Catholic bishops
Hieronymite bishops
Roman Catholic bishops of Comayagua